Hemlock Creek may refer to:

 Hemlock Creek (New York), a stream in New York
 Hemlock Creek (Fishing Creek tributary), a stream in Pennsylvania
 Hemlock Creek (Yellow River tributary), a stream in Wisconsin
 Hemlock Creek (Lake Erie), a watershed administered by the Long Point Region Conservation Authority, that drains into Lake Erie

See also
Hemlock Run